Sir Neil Smith Currie  (20 August 1926 – 30 July 1999) was a senior Australian public servant and policymaker.

Life and career
Neil Currie was born on 20 August 1926 in Mackay, Queensland.

Currie began his Commonwealth public service career in 1948 as a cadet in the Department of External Affairs. He graduated from his cadetship alongside Rowen Osborn,  and Barrie Dexter.

Currie married Geraldine Evelyn Dexter in Tokyo in 1951 during his first posting there. Their engagement had been announced in March 1951. Three of the couple's four children were born in Tokyo.

He held several positions as a departmental head, namely Secretary of the Department of Supply between 1971 and 1974, Secretary of the Department of Manufacturing Industry between 1974 and 1975, and Secretary of the Department of Industry and Commerce.

In 1982 then Foreign Minister Tony Street appointed Currie the Australian Ambassador to Japan. His posting, until 1986, was at a time when Japan was Australia's biggest trading partner.

Currie died in Batemans Bay on 30 July 1999, aged 72.  His wife, Geraldine, died on 2 May 2019 at the age of 92.

Awards and honours
Currie was made a Commander of the Order of the British Empire in 1978. In 1982 he was appointed a Knight Bachelor.

In 2000, the Australia Japan Foundation established the Sir Neil Currie Australian Studies Award Program to commemorate Currie's life and his contribution to Australian-Japanese relations.

A street in the Canberra suburb of Casey in 2009 was named Neil Currie Street in Currie's honour.

References

1926 births
1999 deaths
Australian Commanders of the Order of the British Empire
Australian Knights Bachelor
Australian public servants
Ambassadors of Australia to Japan
People from Mackay, Queensland
University of Western Australia alumni